Global Wars is a professional wrestling event held annually since 2012 by the American Ring of Honor (ROH) promotion. Originally named Border Wars, the event was renamed Global Wars in 2014 after ROH announced a partnership with the Japanese New Japan Pro-Wrestling (NJPW) promotion.

Under the new name, the event became a supershow co-produced by the two promotions. The first five were held at the Ted Reeve Arena in Toronto, Ontario, Canada, while the sixth took place at the Frontier Fieldhouse in Chicago Ridge, Illinois. From 2012 to 2016, the event was held in May alongside War of the Worlds, but in 2017, Global Wars was moved to October and made a four-event tour across Buffalo, New York; Pittsburgh, Pennsylvania; Columbus, Ohio; and Villa Park, Illinois. In 2018, the tour was again moved to November with a four-event tour across Buffalo, New York; Toronto, Ontario, Canada; Lowell, Massachusetts; and Lewiston, Maine.

In 2019, ROH announced a three-event tour with the Mexican Consejo Mundial de Lucha Libre (CMLL) promotion as the new partner for the series, renamed Global Wars Espectacular. The events were held in the month of September and the chosen cities were Dearborn, Michigan; Villa Park, Illinois; and Milwaukee, Wisconsin.

Events

See also
ROH/NJPW War of the Worlds
Honor Rising: Japan
Global Wars UK
Global Wars Espectacular
G1 Special in USA

References

External links
Official New Japan Pro-Wrestling website 
Official Ring of Honor website